Antoniu Buci (born January 21, 1990, in Cluj-Napoca, Cluj) is a Romanian weightlifter.

At the 2006 World Championships he ranked 20th in the 56 kg category, with a total of 235 kg.
At the 2007 World Championships he ranked 22nd in the 62 kg category, with a total of 272 kg.

He competed in Weightlifting at the 2008 Summer Olympics in the 62 kg division finishing fourth, with 295 kg, beating his previous personal best by 22 kg.

Buci recently won the silver medal at the 2011 European Weightlifting Championships held in Kazan, Russia.

He is 5 ft 3 inches tall and weighs 137 lb.

References

External links
 sports-reference
 NBC profile
 Athlete Biography BUCI Antoniu at beijing2008

Romanian male weightlifters
1990 births
Living people
Weightlifters at the 2008 Summer Olympics
Olympic weightlifters of Romania
European Weightlifting Championships medalists
Sportspeople from Cluj-Napoca
20th-century Romanian people
21st-century Romanian people